"Head & Heart" is a song by English DJ and producer Joel Corry and English singer MNEK. It was released as a single on 3 July 2020. The song reached number one on the UK Singles Chart in July 2020, becoming the first chart-topper for both Corry and MNEK in their native country. The song has also entered the US Billboard Hot 100; it is the first and second entry on the chart for Joel Corry and MNEK, respectively. The song was nominated for Song of the Year at the 2021 ceremony.

At the APRA Music Awards of 2022, the song won Most Performed Australian Work and Most Performed Dance/Electronic Work.

On 9 December 2022, the song surpassed 1 billion streams on Spotify.

Chart performance
"Head & Heart" reached number one in the United Kingdom on 24 July 2020, after first entering the UK Singles Chart at number fifteen two weeks earlier. It became both Corry and MNEK's first number one in their native country and remained at the top position for six consecutive weeks, and was certified Platinum for exceeding 600,000 units on 11 September 2020. The song went on to spend 71 weeks on the UK Singles Chart. The song also reached number one on the Scottish Singles Chart.

"Head & Heart" also reached number one in Ireland and the Netherlands and was a top ten hit in several other countries, including Australia, Belgium, Denmark, Germany, New Zealand and Sweden. It also peaked at number 12 in Greece.

Track listing

Charts

Weekly charts

Year-end charts

Certifications

Release history

See also
 List of number-one singles of 2020 (Ireland)
 List of UK Singles Chart number ones of the 2020s
 List of UK Dance Singles Chart number ones of 2020

References

2020 singles
2020 songs
Asylum Records singles
Dutch Top 40 number-one singles
Irish Singles Chart number-one singles
Joel Corry songs
MNEK songs
Number-one singles in Israel
Songs written by MNEK
UK Singles Chart number-one singles
Ultratop 50 Singles (Flanders) number-one singles
Songs written by Robert Harvey (musician)